M Tigers FC is a South African football (soccer) club, with the full official name Mahlangu Tigers. They are based in Tembisa, Gauteng. The club were previously known as PJ Stars Kings. In May 2007, PJ Stars Kings were deducted 15 points by SAFA for using unregistered players. After this point deduction, the team suffered a relegation from National First Division, to play the next season in Vodacom League. The club was at this point of time either sold or renamed to "M Tigers FC".

Achievements
In the first season of the renamed club, they won the Gauteng Province of Vodacom League. Thus they had qualified for the play-off stage, where 5 provincial winners from the Inland stream, would play a round robin format, with the best placed team to promote for the National First Division. In this group, M Tigers ended only as third, with 4 points for 4 matches. No promotion was gained, and thus they still play in Vodacom League.

External links
Profile at Nedbank.co.za
SAFA Official Website -database with results of Vodacom League

References

Association football clubs established in 2007
SAFA Second Division clubs
Soccer clubs in Gauteng
2007 establishments in South Africa
Ekurhuleni